Heroes is an album by country singers Johnny Cash (his 72nd overall album release) and Waylon Jennings, released on Columbia Records in 1986 (see 1986 in music).

Background
Cash and Jennings first met in the mid sixties.  Cash, who had fallen in love with June Carter but could not move in with her because her divorce was not final, rented a one-bedroom apartment in Madison, Tennessee so he could be close to her (the period is documented in the Cash biopic Walk the Line, with Waylon played by his son Shooter Jennings).  "It was like a sitcom; we were the original 'Odd Couple,'" Jennings wrote in his memoir.  "I was supposed to clean up, and John was the one doing the cooking.  If I'd be in one room polishing, he'd be in the other room making a mess...making himself a mess."  Comically, although both men were taking amphetamines by the fistful, each tried to hide it from each other.   In 1978, in the midst of Waylon's superstar success as a key figure in the outlaw country movement, the pair scored a #2 hit duet with "There Ain't No Good Chain Gang."  The duo had previously worked with Willie Nelson and Kris Kristofferson to form the highly successful Highwaymen, with whom they would work together again in the early 1990s, but Heroes was their first and only full-length LP.

Recording and composition
Heroes was Cash's second-last original release on Columbia, with which he parted ways soon after the record's release (though he later returned to Columbia alongside Jennings for Highwayman 2 in 1990).  It was produced by Chips Moman, who had helmed the Highwaymen sessions and had produced several Jennings albums, including 1977's Ol' Waylon.  Despite the success of the single "Highwayman" and Waylon's chart topping album Will the Wolf Survive (his first album for MCA after leaving RCA after twenty years), their presence on the charts had diminished compared to previous years.  "Even Cowgirls Get the Blues," the single from Heroes, reflected this state of affairs, reaching #35 on the country charts.  The song was composed by Cash's son-in-law Rodney Crowell, who also contributes "I'm Never Gonna Roam Again."  The duo also included "Love Is the Way," written by Kristofferson.

The tone of the album is bright, congenial, and sober, far removed from the hell raising past that had become a big part of each man's legend.   It opens with a tribute to their fans, "Folks Out on the Road."  The patriotic ode to Dixie, "American by Birth," also courts the country music fan base, augmented with marching band horns.  The title track taps a similar vein, celebrating courage and self-sacrifice (this is not the song of the same name that appears on Jennings' 1982 duet album WWII with Willie Nelson, also produced by Moman).  Cash co-wrote one song, "Field of Diamonds," which he would record again fourteen years later for American III: Solitary Man (2000).  The last track, "One Too Many Mornings" is a song written by Bob Dylan for his album The Times They Are a-Changin', and had been recorded, but deemed unusable, by Cash and Dylan in 1969 during the sessions for Nashville Skyline.  Jennings had recorded Dylan's "Don't Think Twice, It's Alright" during his earliest recording sessions for A&M.

Reception
The album got as high as #13 on the Billboard country albums charts. Cash the solo artist would not have another higher charting LP until 2000's American III: Solitary Man (#11 C&W).  Bruce Eder of AllMusic calls the LP "one of the most obscure records in either artist's output, a fact that's astonishing, given the quality of the music, the singing, and the overall production. Co-produced by Chips Moman, and with Cash and Jennings at the top of their game (and so good at what they do that they make it sound easy), there's not a weak point anywhere here."

Track listing

Personnel 
 Johnny Cash - vocals, guitar
 Waylon Jennings - vocals, guitar
 Rick Yancey, Danny Hogan - backing vocals
 Al Casey, James B. Cobb Jr., Jerry Shook, Reggie Young - guitar
 Marty Stuart - guitar, mandolin
 Ralph Mooney - steel guitar
 Larry Butler, Bobby Emmons, Bobby Wood - keyboards
 Gene Chrisman - drums
 Jimmy Tittle - bass
 Mike Leech - bass, arranger
 The A-Strings - strings
 Ace Cannon, Dennis Good, Wayne Jackson - horns
 Mickey Raphael - harp

Additional personnel 

 Chips Moman - producer, engineer
 David Cherry - engineer
 Steve Hoffman - mastering
 Bill Johnson - art director
 Mike Ragogna - reissue director
 Murray Brenman - reissue design
 Kevin Gray - CD preparation
Kal Roberts - photography

Charts
Album - Billboard (United States)

Singles - Billboard (United States)

References

External links 
 Luma Electronic's Johnny Cash discography listing

1986 albums
Columbia Records albums
Johnny Cash albums
Waylon Jennings albums
Albums produced by Chips Moman
Collaborative albums